Rachel Leonie Ford (born 1990/1991), known professionally as Rachel Redford, is a Welsh actress. She is best known for her theatre work.

Early life
Redford is from Penarth in the Vale of Glamorgan. Her mother Jennifer Lewis is also an actress and briefly appeared in Pobol y Cwm. Redford attended Stanwell School. She graduated with a Bachelor of Arts in Acting from the Royal Academy of Dramatic Art (RADA) in 2013.

Career
After graduating from RADA, Redford began her career in Welsh theatre productions, starring in the 2013 Cardiff productions of It's A Family Affair at the Sherman Theatre as Lipochka and Parallel Lines at Chapter Arts Centre as Steph, as well as Not the Worst Place at Theatr Clwyd in Mold as Emma. For her performance in Parallel Lines, she was nominated for Best Actress by the Theatre Critics of Wales.

That same year, Redford made her London stage debut in Adler & Gibb at the Royal Court Theatre and Ghost from a Perfect Place at the Arcola Theatre. This was followed in 2015 by roles in Closer at Donmar Warehouse and Luna Gale at Hampstead Theatre in London, and The Crucible at the Royal Exchange in Manchester.

In 2017, Redford made her television debut with the recurring role of Lauren in the E4 comedy-drama Gap Year. That same year, she originated the role of Beth in the play The Jungle, performing in the Off-West End, West End, Off-Broadway, and San Francisco runs of the show at the Young Vic, Playhouse Theatre, St. Ann's Warehouse, and Curran Theatre respectively. For the Off-Broadway run, the cast and crew collectively won an Obie Award in the Special Citations category.

Redford starred as Masha in the 2021 world premiere of Cat Goscovitch's one-woman play A Russian Doll at the Barn Theatre in Cirencester, followed by a run at the Arcola in London.

Redford played Lady Rhea Royce in the first season of the HBO fantasy series House of the Dragon, a Game of Thrones prequel and adaptation of George R. R. Martin's companion book Fire and Blood. She has an upcoming role in the second season of Shadow and Bone on Netflix.

Filmography

Stage

Awards and nominations

Notes

References

External links
 
 Rachel Redford at United Agents
 Rachel Redford at Spotlight

1990s births
Living people
21st-century Welsh actresses
Alumni of RADA
People educated at Stanwell School
People from Penarth
Welsh stage actresses
Welsh film actresses
Welsh television actresses